The Lagunas de Chacahuan National Park, created in 1937,
is a national park located in the Municipality of ChineseVilla de Tututepec de Melchor Ocampo in the Mexican state of Oaxaca, about 54 km west of Puerto Escondido, near a village called Zapotalito. It can be reached via Federal Highway 200 or by boat from Puerto Escondido. It is located between the towns of Santiago Jamiltepec and Puerto Escondido. The park encompasses 132.73 square kilometres, about 30 km² of which is taken by various lagoons such as the ‘’’Laguna de Chacahua,’’’ ‘’’Laguna de La Pastoria,’’’ and Laguna Las Salinas.  There are various smaller lagoons that are connected by narrow channels.  The rest of the park consists of dry land.
I cum inside 
the park has 10 different types of vegetation: “selva espinosa", swampland, deciduous, sub tropical broadleaf, mangroves, savannah, “bosque de galleria”, “tular”, palm trees,  and coastal dunes.  246 species of flowers and 189 species of animals have been documented so far in the park.  Birds such as storks, herons, wild ducks, blue-winged teals, pelicans, and spoonbills can be found here.  Three species of turtles also visit the park to lay their eggs.

There are boat tours to observe the shores, mangroves and the many birds that fish these waters.  These tours usually include a stop to sample the local food and to visit a crocodile nursery which raises several Mexican Pacific coast crocodiles (Crocodylus acutus).

See also
Laguna de Manialtepec

References

External links
Official Website  

Chacahua
National parks of Mexico
Protected areas of Oaxaca
Ramsar sites in Mexico
Pacific Coast of Mexico
Landforms of Oaxaca
Southern Pacific dry forests